Warfaze (Bengali: ওয়ারফেইজ) is a Bangladeshi heavy metal band formed in 6 June 1984 in Dhaka by Kamal, Meer, Helal, Naimul, and Bappy. They are one of the early heavy metal bands in Bangladesh. The band had numerous line-up changes since 1984. Since its inception, the band has released seven studio albums, one compilation album, and several singles.

The band has experimented with different sub-genres of rock and heavy metal over the years.

History

First decade and breakthrough – Warfaze and অবাক ভালোবাসা (Obak Bhalobasa) (1984–1994) 

The first lineup of Warfaze in 1984 consisted of Bappi on vocals, Mir and Naimul on guitars, Kamal on bass, Helal on drums. This initial line-up underwent the first of many changes with Helal, Mir, and Bappi having to leave the band for personal reasons. By that time Kamal met Tipu in early 1986 and Tipu joined Warfaze as the drummer and co-founder. The band was far from breaking through to the mainstream music scene in Bangladesh. Heavy metal music was not much popular in Bangladesh back then.

In 1986, Kamal took up lead guitar duties, Sheikh Monirul Alam Tipu as a drummer, and Kamal and Tipu took Babna Karim as the bassist, and Reshad as the vocalist. This second lineup had to be discontinued when Naimul emigrated to the US. At that time, there were three other Dhaka-based metal bands: Rockstrata, In Dhaka, and Aces. Mashuk Rahman from In Dhaka and Fuad from Aces volunteered to help Warfaze as guest members (guitarist) and Warfaze introduced keyboard position in the band and Russell took the position. At the time, Warfaze was mostly a cover band, covering bands such as Deep Purple, Whitesnake, Dokken, Iron Maiden or Guns N' Roses.

In 1988, Reshad had left the band for some personal reason and his place was filled by Sunjoy. Kamal had made arrangements for further education in the US by 1991. However, inspired by Maqsud, former vocalist of Feedback, the band performed their own Bangla songs at a concert arranged by BAMBA at the University of Dhaka on 26 April 1992. The band at this concert decided to make a mixed album, but as it turned out Warfaze had enough songs to be able to release a solo album. The band went to release their self-titled album, Warfaze, on 21 June 1991. The album featured the songs "Boshe Achi Eka" and "Ekti Chele". At the time, Bangladeshi music listeners were still new to metal. Any lyrics other than those inspired by romanticism or patriotism were rare. It took several months for the album to gain popularity but later succeeded.

The album was followed up by a concert on 7 January 1992 at the Rawa Club. The next album, Obak Bhalobasha, was released by Sargam in 1994. Obak Bhalobasha featured songs with heavier sounds. Warfaze's sound got developed on this album. "Obak Bhalobasha", the title song from the album was a big hit. This song was composed with soft melodic structures in a progressive way. The song is one of the earliest progressive rock songs in the history of Bangladesh. The song was sung by Babna Karim (Warfaze's bassist), instead of their lead singer, Sunjoy. "Obak Bhalobasha" is one of the fewest Warfaze's hit songs which weren't sung by their lead singers. !Obak Bhalobasha! is also one of the longest tracks recorded by Warfaze, spanning for 8 minutes and 37 seconds. After completing Obak Bhalobasha Russel Ali left the band at this stage to start a music career in the United States later that year.

জীবনধারা (Jibon Dhara) and অসামাজিক (Oshamajik) (1996–1998) 

The band released the album Jibondhara in 1996 December, with a line-up of vocal- Sunjoy, guitar- Kamal, bass & vocal- Babna Karim, drums- Tipu, and guest keyboardist Fuad played together on the same album. Iqbal Asif Jewel joined as guest backup vocal and Ruchi backup vocal (guest).

Iqbal Asif Jewel joined as a guitarist and second vocalist from another rock band, Legend. Babna had to leave for his career and study in the U.S.A. therefore he was replaced by Saidus Sumon who played for Oshamajik 1 April 1998. After completing Oshamajik Sunjoy left for his personal career.

Sumon left to pursue a career both as a solo artist with his band Aurthohin and Biju joined replacing Sumon. Iqbal Asif Jewel left the band to join Miles. Fuad Ibne Rabbi also left the band for his personal career.

আলো (Alo) and মহারাজ (Moharaj) (2000–2003) 

The band underwent many changes in line-up over the next eight years. Their guitarist Balam, replaced Iqbal Asif Jewel. Mizan replaced Sunjoy on vocals while Shams became a keyboard player from 1999 and Biju as bass. Tipu and Kamal stood in their position still. This line-up released the album Aalo আলো (Light) in 2000.

However, 2002 marked changes in the line-up once again with Mizan leaving the band for personal reasons and Kamal leaving the band for his personal and family issues. Kamal joined Sumon's band Aurthohin in 2006. Balam, who had already sung three notable songs in the album 'Alo' took up vocal & guitar duties as Mizan left and Sazzad was recruited from Metal Maze as the lead guitarist replacing Kamal. Bass player Biju left for Canada for his study and career. All the while, Tipu solely held the band together for its existence and recruited Cézanne as the bassist of the emerging progressive metal band Artcell. Later Balam departed to pursue a solo career as a commercial pop artist.

Kamal rejoined the band in 2007 and the band recruited Oni Hasan from the band Vibe, resulting in a major change in their sound, with neoclassical metal influences especially in live performances.

পথচলা (Pothchala) (2009) 
 
Following the release of a compilation album (sponsored by Nokia) which includes re-recorded versions of their songs along with a couple of new singles titled "Tomake" and "Omanush", the band began touring extensively. With a new and stable lineup since 2007 that had stayed together for almost more than 5 years then, the band went on to celebrate their silver jubilee at a gala concert, which featured performances from both past and present members of Warfaze at the Winter Garden, Hotel Sheraton, Dhaka. Tipu announced that a live concert recording album was planned, along with a new studio album which later came out in 2012 titled Shotto.

The band continued to experiment with their sound with the release of a fusion album entitled Somorpon, merging elements of heavy metal with traditional Bangladeshi folk music as a tribute to Hason Raja, Lalon, and Baul Shah Abdul Karim working with Sumon's band Aurthohin and solo artist Habib Wahid. Warfaze tributed the songs of Lalon, Aurthohin tributed the songs of Hason Raja and Habib Wahid tributed the songs of Baul Shah Abdul Karim.

সত্য (Sotto) (2012) 

Shotto, the new album was released on 21 October 2012 featuring the same line-up as in Poth Chola. Tracks from the album include "Agami", "Na", "Purnota", "Shotto", "Jedin", "Rupkotha", "Jonosrot", and "Projonmo". The album also included an unreleased single from the early 2000s called "Protikkha".

With Oni Hasan taking a break for his studies in the United Kingdom and Kamal recovering from surgeries, the band asked Faisal (from Metal Maze), Samir (from Powersurge), and Shrapnel Method to perform as guest members on live shows.

With Oni playing lead guitar in the band, the sound of the album got significantly changed. Along with Kamal's shredding, Oni's heavy groove metal riffs were introduced. As well as his jaw-dropping dive bombs, whammy pedal uses, melodic fast arpeggiated solos with sweep picking can be heard.

At midnight on 13 February 2013, Warfaze performed at the Projonmo Chattar to show their support for the Shahbag protest in Dhaka, Bangladesh, in demand of capital punishment for Abdul Quader Mollah and all the other accused war criminals of the 1971 Liberation War of Bangladesh. It also marked the return of Kamal with his solos.

In late 2014, Oni Hasan left the band to pursue higher education.

Warfaze has performed their mega reunion Legacy Concert on 30 January 2015 to celebrate 30 years of music-making, The legacy concert took place at Gulnaksha Hall, International Convention City in Bashundhara Residential Area, Dhaka. The celebration has brought together four of its past members – Babna Karim, Sunjoy, Balam, and Romel Ali – with its current line-up on the stage. On their Facebook page on 7 April 2016 they announced that Mizan has left the band. Later they announced Palash Noor as their new vocal.

Musical style and influences
The band has been consistently cited as an inspiration by most active heavy metal artists today in Bangladesh as one of the first bands to introduce metal to Bangladesh. The band used to play cover versions of bands like Iron Maiden, Deep Purple, Whitesnake, Scorpions, Guns N' Roses and Dokken, etc. in their early years. Throughout their career, the band has experimented with multiple genres of rock and metal.

Discography
Studio albums
 Warfaze (Sargam, 1991)
 Obak Bhalobasha (Surprising Love) (Sargam, 1994)
 Jibondhara (Lifestyle) (Soundtek, 1996)
 অসামাজিক (Unsocial) (G-Series, 1998)
 আলো (Light) (Soundtek, 2000)
 মহারাজ (Your Majesty) (Ektaar Music, 2003)
 পথচলা (Walking Paths) (G-Series, 2009)
 সত্য (Truth) (Deadline Music, 2012)

Compilation albums
 Best Collection – 4 in 1(1999)

Mixed albums
 Dhun – 6 Band Mixed Album (ধুন) (1997)
 Hit! Run! Out! (1998)
 6 Band "99" (1999)
 Tribute Album – Somorpon (সমর্পণ) (2011)

Members 
Present members
 Sheikh Monirul Alam Tipu – drums, percussion, band leader 
 Ibrahim Ahmed Kamal – lead guitar ; bass 
 Palash Noor – vocals 
 Samir Hafiz – lead guitar 
 Soumen Das – rhythm guitar 
 Naim Haque Roger – bass guitar 
 Shams Mansoor Ghani – keyboard 

Past members
 Sunjoy – vocals 
 Babna Karim – bass, vocals 
 Balam – vocals, guitar 
 Mizan Rahman Mizan – vocals 
 Iqbal Asif Jewel – guitar, vocals 
 Sazzad Arefin – guitar 
 Oni Hasan – guitar 
 Saidus Sumon – bass guitar, vocals 
 Biju – bass guitar 
 Cézanne Ahmed – bass guitar 
 Russel Ali – keyboard, guitar 
 Romel Ali – keyboard
 Fuad Ibne Rabbi – keyboard, guitar 
 Helal – drums, 
 Bappi – vocals 
 Mir – guitar 
 Naimul – lead guitar 
 Reshad – vocals

Timeline

See also

 List of hard rock musicians (N–Z)
 Music of Bangladesh

References 

1984 establishments in Bangladesh
Bangladeshi hard rock musical groups
Bangladeshi heavy metal musical groups
Musical groups established in 1984